Krešimir Lončar (born February 12, 1983) is a Croatian former professional basketball player, currently working as manager of sport & scouting for s.Oliver Würzburg of the Basketball Bundesliga.

Professional career

In July 2008, Lončar signed a two-year contract with UNICS Kazan. With UNICS he won the Russian Cup in 2009 and was also named the MVP. UNICS Kazan ended up third in the 2009–10 Russian Superleague season.

In June 2010, he signed a two-year-deal with BC Khimki. In his first season with BC Khimki he was selected to play the All Star Game 2011. In April 2011, BC Khimki won the championship of VTB United League and Krešimir was voted the best power forward of the tournament. In June 2012, he extended his contract with Khimki for two more seasons.

On 2 July 2014, he signed a two-year deal with Valencia Basket. He left Valencia after one season.

On October 1, 2015, he signed a one-year contract with the German team Alba Berlin.

On June 29, 2016, Lončar signed a two-year deal with s.Oliver Baskets.

On June 28, 2020, Lončar announced that he will continue to work with s.Oliver Würzburg, as director of sports & scouting personnel.

Croatian national team
Lončar was also a member of the Croatian national basketball team. With them he played at the 2008 Olympic Games in Beijing and the Eurobasket 2009 in Poland.

Both at the Olympics and the Eurobasket Croatia ended up sixth. Therefore, they are directly qualified for the 2010 FIBA World Championship in Turkey where Lončar was also part of the Croatian national team.

Video gallery

References

External links

 Krešimir Lončar at acb.com
 Krešimir Lončar at eurobasket.com
 Krešimir Lončar at euroleague.net
 Krešimir Lončar at fiba.com

1983 births
Living people
Alba Berlin players
Basketball players at the 2008 Summer Olympics
BC Khimki players
BC Kyiv players
BC UNICS players
Centers (basketball)
Croatian men's basketball players
KK Split players
Liga ACB players
Olympic basketball players of Croatia
Pallacanestro Treviso players
PBC Lokomotiv-Kuban players
Power forwards (basketball)
S.Oliver Würzburg players
Basketball players from Split, Croatia
Teramo Basket players
Valencia Basket players
Articles containing video clips
2010 FIBA World Championship players